The KF Tirana Reserves and Academy are the reserve team of KF Tirana, They play in the North section of the Albanian U-19 Superliga and Albanian U-17 Superliga.

Under-21s Squad

Notable youth team players

 Ansi Agolli
 Krenar Alimehmeti
 Myslym Alla
 Millan Baçi
 Dritan Baholli
 Patrik Bardhi
 Idriz Batha
 Elvi Berisha
 Vasif Biçaku
 Arian Bimo
 Ervin Bulku
 Alban Bushi
 Klisman Cake
 Jurgen Çelhaka
 Fatos Daja
 Nevil Dede
 Fjoralb Deliaj
 Petrit Dibra
 Albi Doka
 David Domgjoni
 Erbim Fagu
 Alush Gavazaj
 Grent Halili
 Erion Hoxhallari
 Skënder Hyka
 Marsel Ismailgeci
 Renaldo Kalari
 Erando Karabeci
 Dorian Kërçiku
 Agustin Kola
 Naim Kryeziu
 Ardian Mema
 Arben Minga
 Mario Morina
 Gentian Muça
 Shkëlqim Muça
 Ernest Muçi
 Marlind Nuriu
 Rei Nuriu
 Aristidh Parapani
 Panajot Pano
 Jetmir Sefa
 Elvis Sina
 Rexhep Spahiu
 Afrim Taku
 Aurel Verija
 Jurgen Vrapi
 Niko Xhaçka

Football clubs in Albania
Reserve team football in Albania
Football clubs in Tirana
Reserves and Academy
Football academies in Europe
Youth football in Albania